Jarun Bridge is a planned bridge that will cross the Sava River in Zagreb, the capital of Croatia. The bridge will be located in the western part of the city, Trešnjevka near Lake Jarun. 

The city of Zagreb organized a tender for the design of the Jarun Bridge in 2006, and accepted the project in 2007. Building permits were issued in 2011, but the construction, originally estimated to cost around €40 million, did not start due to a lack of funds. As of 2013, the city was considering a pedestrian-and-cycle design as a cheaper alternative. In early 2020, the process of acquiring the building permits was reinitiated.

References 

Bridges in Zagreb
Novi Zagreb
Proposed bridges in Europe
Footbridges
Bridges over the Sava in Croatia
Proposed buildings and structures in Croatia
Pedestrian infrastructure in Croatia